Lake Marshall or Marshall Lake may refer to:

Cities, towns, townships etc.
Lake Marshall Township, a township in Lyon County, Minnesota

Lakes
Marshall Lake (Idaho), a glacial lake in Custer County, Idaho
Lake Marshall (Lyon County, Minnesota)
Marshall Lake (Montana), in Missoula County, Montana